Harold Bertram Rose (9 August 1923 – 10 March 2018) was an English economist and professor at the London School of Economics and the London Business School. He served in the Royal Artillery during the Second World War and participated in the Battle of Ramree Island in 1945.

References 

1923 births
2018 deaths
Academics of London Business School
Academics of the London School of Economics
British Army personnel of World War II
English economists
Royal Artillery officers